Kot Suleman (Urdu کو ٹ سيلمان ) is small part of village Dhoong near village  Trati in Union Council Narali located in Gujar Khan Tehsil, District Rawalpindi, Punjab, Pakistan. It has a population of 250. Kot Suleman is a historic town of Village Dhoong, Rawalpindi District. Kot Suleman is famous for its natural reserves of oil and natural gas.

Nearby educational institutions
 Government Primary School, Trati
 Government Boys High School, Dhoong
 Government Girls High School, Dhoong
 Al-Hijra Islamic Secondary School, Dhoong
 Dad Public School, Dhoong

Nearby hospital
 Basic Health Unit (Dhoong village)

Post office
 Post Office (Dhoong 47770), General Post Office in Gujar Khan

Banks and financial institution
 Habib Bank Limited (Dhoong Branch)

Languages
 Pothowari and Punjabi are the main languages of Kot Suleman, other languages are Urdu and English.

Other villages near Kot Suleman
 Trati, Dhoong, Ahdi, Narali (Union Council), Daultala, Jatli (Police Station), Dhoke Adra, Dhoke Budhal, Dhoke Cheemian, Dhoke Kanyal, Dhoke Landian, Faryal, Fazolian, Kayal, Thakra Mohra, Mastala, (Langah, Domali, Jand, Chakwal - Chakwal District)

Transport
 Kot Suleman is situated at Daultala – Mulhal Mughlan Road. Gujar Khan is about 18 kilometers, Rawalpindi - Islamabad is about 45 kilometers and Chakwal is about 26 kilometers from Kot Suleman. There are many ways to get around Kot Suleman which Includes public transport, buses, suzukis, van, cars, taxis, auto-rickshaws, motor cycles and tractors etc.

References

Populated places in Rawalpindi District